Alibek is a masculine given name. Notable people with the name include:

Alibek Aliev (born 1996), Russian-Swedish footballer
Alibek Bashkaev (born 1989), Russian judoka
Alibek Buleshev (born 1981), Kazakhstani footballer
Alibek Delimkhanov (born 1974)
Alibek Sapaýew, Turkmenistan football referee

See also
Ken Alibek (born 1950), Soviet physician, microbiologist and biological warfare expert